John Wolf may refer to:

 John Wolf (diplomat) (born 1948), American diplomat
 John Wolf (gymnast), American Olympic gymnast
 John Baptist Wolf (1907–1996), American historian
 John B. Wolf (pastor) (1925–2017), American Unitarian Universalist pastor in Tulsa, Oklahoma
 John Quincy Wolf (1901–1972), American folklorist and academic

See also
 John Wolfe (disambiguation)